A barabara or barabora (Russian); ulax̂, ulaagamax, ulaq, or ulas (plural) (Aleut); and ciqlluaq (Alutiiq ~ Sugpiaq) were the traditional, main or communal dwelling used by the Alutiiq people and Aleuts, the indigenous people of the Aleutian Islands. They lay partially underground like an earth lodge or pit-house, and most of the house was excavated from the dirt so as to withstand the high forces of wind in the Aleutian chain of islands. Barabaras are no longer used, as present-day Aleuts live in modern houses and apartment buildings.

Overview
The roof of a barabara was generally made from sod and grass layered over a frame of wood or whalebone, and contained a roof doorway for entry. Inside of the barabara was a main room, and a secondary room used for parental purposes. The main room had two rows for cots, less-excavated and higher than the rest of the room. The bottom of the room had one or more holes for an "inhouse". The entrance typically had a small wind envelope, or "Arctic entry", to prevent cold wind, rain or snow from blowing into the main room and cooling it off.  There was usually a small hole in the ceiling from which the smoke from the fire escaped.

Gallery

See also
 Qargi
 Quiggly hole
 Vernacular architecture

References

External links

Beard, D. C. Shelters, Shacks and Shanties. New York: Charles Scribner's Sons, 1916. pg 100-03.
Alaska's Digital Archives, keyword search "barabara"

Aleut culture
House types
Traditional Native American dwellings
Semi-subterranean structures
Vernacular architecture